Maklok is the name of several rural localities in Russia:
Maklok, Smolensk Oblast, a village in Sitkovskoye Rural Settlement of Velizhsky District of Smolensk Oblast
Maklok, Voronezh Oblast, a settlement in Shuberskoye Rural Settlement of Novousmansky District of Voronezh Oblast